Tom Carey (1912–1992) was an Australian professional rugby league footballer who played in the 1930s.  Carey played for St George Dragons, Canterbury-Bankstown and University.  Carey was a foundation player for Canterbury-Bankstown.

Playing career
Carey began his first grade career for St George and played 3 seasons for them before switching to Canterbury in 1935 who were the newly admitted team into the competition.  Carey played in the club first ever game against North Sydney at North Sydney Oval which finished in a 20–5 loss.  Carey is credited as kicking the first goal for the club.

Canterbury-Bankstown finished the 1935 season in second last position narrowly avoiding the wooden spoon which was handed to University.  In 1936, Canterbury managed to do a lot better reaching the preliminary final in their second season as a club.

Carey went on to join University in 1937.  The season would be the club's last in the NSWRL competition as they withdrew from the premiership at the conclusion of the season.  University finished their final year losing all 9 games.  Carey captained and played in the club's final ever game, a 17–0 loss against his former club Canterbury at Belmore Oval.

References

St. George Dragons players
Canterbury-Bankstown Bulldogs players
Sydney University rugby league team players
Rugby league players from Sydney
Rugby league halfbacks
Rugby league five-eighths
Place of birth missing
1912 births
1992 deaths